James McCusker (born 27 December 1939) is a Northern Irish former professional footballer who played as a goalkeeper.

Career
Born in Maghera, McAlea McCusker Bradford City as an amateur in December 1956. He joined the first team in February 1957. He made 7 league appearances for the club. He left the club to join Stockport County in August 1959, for whom he made a further 2 league appearances.

Sources

References

1939 births
Living people
Association footballers from Northern Ireland
Bradford City A.F.C. players
Stockport County F.C. players
English Football League players
Association football goalkeepers